Black Point Power Station is a gas-fired power station in Lung Kwu Tan, New Territories, Hong Kong. The power station is operated by CLP Group.

History
In the late 1980s, China Light and Power (CLP) examined several potential sites for the construction of a new power station. The company came to favour Fan Lau in southern Lantau Island, but this was rejected by the government for environmental reasons, particularly the effects the station would have on Lantau South Country Park. On 20 August 1990, the company announced that it had instead proposed to the government to build the station at Black Point.

The original eight GE 9FA combined cycle gas turbine (CCGT) units (C1 to C8) of the power station were commissioned in stages between 1996 and 2006. These 8 units have since been upgraded to 337.5 MW. 

In 2017, CLP ordered a 550 MW Siemens SGT5-8000H CCGT unit (D1). This unit was completed and was operational mid-2020.  A second CCGT unit (D2) with a capacity of 600 MW  is expected to be operational by 2023.

Operations
The station provides 3,225 MW of power. The complex consists of two halls with four turbines in each hall in C Station producing cleaner power when compared to coal. The last turbine was completed in 2006.

Since its commissioning, gas has been provided from the Yacheng offshore gas field, 750 km south of Hong Kong, in the South China Sea. CLP plans to increase usage of gas for its local generation when more gas becomes available, this change is in line with the Hong Kong Government’s proposed enhancements to the Air Quality Objectives and Climate Change Strategy.

Ownership
The station is owned by the Castle Peak Power Company Limited (CAPCO). CAPCO is 70 per cent owned by CLP Power Hong Kong Limited and 30 per cent by China Southern Power Grid International (HK) Co., Limited.

See also

 Electricity sector in Hong Kong
 List of power stations in Hong Kong

References

1996 establishments in Hong Kong
ExxonMobil buildings and structures
Natural gas-fired power stations in Hong Kong
Tuen Mun District